Marcel Maas (7 May 1897 – 11 June 1950) was a Dutch-Belgian pianist. He died at his home in Sint-Genesius-Rode, on 11 June 1950. His repertoire includes Bach and Scarlatti to the moderns; he was an appreciated interpreter of the solo piano music of Franck, Debussy and Ravel.

Life

Early years 
He was born on 7 May 1897 in Clermont-Ferrand, France, where his father, a successful Dutch operatic bass, was then based. The family soon moved to Belgium and Marcel eventually took Belgian nationality. His brother, Robert Maas was a cellist.

Career 
He studied at the Royal Conservatory of Brussels with Arthur De Greef and soon began an international career. In 1933 he became a professor at the Royal Brussels Conservatoire.

During the 1930s he joined the Quator Pro Arte, created with violinist Alfred Dubois and Robert Maas. Pro Arte became one of three outstanding sonata partnerships which flourished in the 1930s, along with Adolf Busch – Rudolf Serkin and Szymon Goldberg/Lili Kraus.

References

External links 
 Collection of archival recordings by Marcel Maas on ContraClassics

Belgian classical pianists
1897 births
1950 deaths
20th-century classical pianists